Greater Manchester bus route 43 operates in Greater Manchester between Manchester Piccadilly Gardens bus station and Manchester Airport.

History
Route 43 is one of many "Skyline" links that connect various places to Manchester Airport. Prior to 2007 it ran every 10 minutes during the day, but on 2 September 2007 a night service was introduced, with buses operating every 30 minutes due to popular demand for a night link.

Current route
Route 43 serves the busy Wilmslow Road bus corridor, which includes universities and hospitals. It is the only route in Greater Manchester to operate on Christmas Day. It operates via these primary locations:
Manchester Piccadilly Gardens bus station  for Piccadilly Gardens tram stop  and Manchester Piccadilly station 
Oxford Road station 
University of Manchester
Rusholme
Fallowfield
Withington
West Didsbury for West Didsbury tram stop 
Northenden
Benchill for Benchill tram stop 
Crossacres tram stop 
Wythenshawe bus station for Wythenshawe Town Centre tram stop   
Robinswood Road tram stop 
Manchester Airport   for Manchester Airport station

References

043
Manchester Airport